Robert M. Walker (February 6, 1929 – February 12, 2004) was an American physicist,  a planetary scientist, the founder and director of McDonnell Center for the Space Sciences at Washington University in St. Louis, noted for his co-discovery of the etchability of nuclear particle tracks in solids, as well as his conjecture that meteorites and lunar rocks contain a record of the ancient radiation history of various stars including the Sun.
Asteroid 6372 was named Walker in his honor by the International Astronomical Union.
Walker was a member of the National Academy of Sciences.
Walker was also a fellow of the American Physical Society, the American Geophysical Union, the Meteoritical Society and the American Association for the Advancement of Science. 
He was also a founder and the first president of Volunteers in Technical Assistance (VITA).

Notable distinctions 
 1964    American Nuclear Society Annual Award 
 1966    Yale Engineering Association Annual Award for Contributions to Basic and Applied Science 
 1967    Doctor, honoris causa, Union College
 1970    NASA Exceptional Scientific Achievement Award 
 1971    E. O. Lawrence Memorial Award of the U.S. Atomic Energy Commission 
 1973    Elected to the National Academy of Sciences
 1975    Docteur, honoris causa, University of Clermont-Ferrand, France
 1985    Antarctic Service Medal of the National Science Foundation
 1991    J. Lawrence Smith Medal, National Academy of Sciences
 1992    Officier de l’Ordre des Palmes Academiques
 1993    Leonard Medal of the Meteoritical Society
 1997    Peter Raven Lifetime Achievement Award, St. Louis Academy of Science
 1999    Asteroid 6372 named Walker by International Astronomical Union
 2004    Doctor, honoris causa (posthumous), Washington University in St. Louis

Life and career 
 February 6, 1929, born in Philadelphia, Pennsylvania
 1950 graduated from Union College with a degree in physics
 1954 Ph.D. in physics, Yale University
 1966 the McDonnell Professor of Physics, Washington University
 February 12, 2004 died in Brussels, Belgium stomach cancer

Personal life 
Walker was married to the cosmochemist Ghislaine Crozaz.

References

External links 

 P. Buford Price and Ernst Zinner, "Robert M. Walker", Biographical Memoirs of the National Academy of Sciences (2005)

1929 births
2004 deaths
20th-century American physicists
Yale Graduate School of Arts and Sciences alumni
Union College (New York) alumni
Members of the United States National Academy of Sciences
Scientists from Philadelphia
Scientists from St. Louis
Physicists from Missouri
Scientists from Missouri
Fellows of the American Geophysical Union
Scientists from New York (state)
Washington University physicists
Washington University in St. Louis faculty
Fellows of the American Physical Society
Deaths from stomach cancer